Diviana is a genus of snout moths. It was described by Ragonot in 1888, and contains the species D. eudoreella. It is found in the southern United States.

References

Phycitinae
Monotypic moth genera
Moths of North America